Gnoma sticticollis is a species of beetle in the family Cerambycidae. It was described by Thomson in 1857. It is known from Malaysia, Singapore, Java, and possibly Sulawesi.

References

Lamiini
Beetles described in 1857